A penumbral lunar eclipse took place on Sunday, July 27, 1980, the second of three penumbral lunar eclipses in 1980. This very subtle penumbral eclipse was essentially invisible to the naked eye; though it lasted 2 hours, 17 minutes and 36.3 seconds, just 25.354% of the Moon's disc was in partial shadow (with no part of it in complete shadow). The moon passed in the northern edge of the Earth's penumbral shadow, and was the 70th lunar eclipse of Saros cycle 109.

Visibility

Related lunar eclipses

Eclipses in 1980 
 A total solar eclipse on Saturday, 16 February 1980.
 A penumbral lunar eclipse on Saturday, 1 March 1980.
 A penumbral lunar eclipse on Sunday, 27 July 1980.
 An annular solar eclipse on Sunday, 10 August 1980.
 A penumbral lunar eclipse on Tuesday, 26 August 1980.

Lunar year series

Half-Saros cycle
A lunar eclipse will be preceded and followed by solar eclipses by 9 years and 5.5 days (a half saros). This lunar eclipse is related to one partial solar eclipse of Solar Saros 116.

Saros series 

This lunar eclipse is the third to last member of Saros series 109. The next event is on August 8, 1998. The previous event was on July 17, 1962.

See also 
List of lunar eclipses
List of 20th-century lunar eclipses

Notes

External links 
 

1980-07
1980 in science
July 1980 events